Abdulla Hassan Kamal (born 7 July 1996), is a Qatari professional footballer who plays as a forward.

Career statistics

Club

References

External links
 

1996 births
Living people
Qatari footballers
Association football forwards
Al Ahli SC (Doha) players
Umm Salal SC players
Al Kharaitiyat SC players
Qatar Stars League players